is a 2014 Japanese film directed by Eiki Taminato and screened at the 1st New Directors Film Festival in 2014.

Plot

Cast 
 Fumiko Tomatsu as Miki Kusano
 Shinichi Taminato as Mitsuru Izumikawa
 Shinjirô Takahashi as Chief Editor Joji
 Daiju Matsuo as Forest Man
 Maia Umetani as Shizuka Izumikawa

References

External links 
 

2014 films
2010s Japanese-language films
2010s Japanese films